Kwan Aij-lie is an Indonesian neurosurgeon. She is the President of the International College of Surgeons.

Biography 
Kwan was born in Indonesia. She received a master's degree in healthcare management and her doctorate from Kaohsiung Medical University. She was the first female  neurosurgeon in Taiwan.

She teaches at Kaohsiung Medical University.

In 2022 she was elected President of the International College of Surgeons, she was the  first  woman to hold the position.

Awards and recognition 
In 2021 she was awarded the Taiwanese foreign ministry's Friend of Foreign Service Medal.

References

Kaohsiung Medical University alumni
Indonesian neurosurgeons
Living people
Indonesian expatriates in Taiwan
Year of birth missing (living people)